Gibberula subtrigona is a species of sea snail, a marine gastropod mollusk, in the family Cystiscidae.

References

subtrigona
Gastropods described in 1864
Cystiscidae